Between Queens and the Cities is a 2022 memoir by Niranjan Kunwar. It was published in 2020 by FinePrint Publication. It is the first English queer memoir to be published in Nepal. The book chronicles the life of the author as gay man between various cities like New York City, Kathmandu between 1999 and 2019. The book shows the struggle of a gay person in Nepali society.

Synopsis 
The book chronicles the life of the author from 1999, when he left for New York from Kathmandu at the age of 19 to coming back to Kathmandu. It show the struggle of being a queer person and challenges that an LGBT+ person has to face in Nepali society.

Reception 
The book received positive responses from the critics and readers. Sahina Shrestha hailed the book as " beautifully crafted coming of age story" in her review for the Nepali Times.

See also 
 Land Where I Flee
 Arresting God in Kathmandu

References

External links 
 Official Page
 Goodreads Page

2020 books
21st-century Nepalese books
English books by Nepalese writer
Nepalese books
Nepalese memoirs
Nepalese non-fiction books
LGBT autobiographies
2020s LGBT literature
Nepalese biographies
Nepalese literature in English
LGBT literature in Nepal
